Kota railway division is one of the three railway divisions under West Central Railway zone of Indian Railways. This railway division was formed on 1 April 1952 and its headquarters are located at Kota in the state of Rajasthan of India.

Jabalpur railway division  and Bhopal railway division are the other two railway divisions under WCR Zone headquartered at Jabalpur.

List of railway stations and towns 
The list includes the stations under the Kota division and their station category.

Stations closed for Passengers -

References

 
Divisions of Indian Railways
1952 establishments in Rajasthan

Transport in Kota, Rajasthan